The Gumbinnen Operation, also known as the Goldap Operation (or Goldap-Gumbinnen Operation), was a Soviet offensive on the Eastern Front late in 1944, in which forces of the 3rd Belorussian Front attempted to penetrate the borders of East Prussia.

Planning

The operation was planned as a result of the success of the Memel Offensive Operation to the north. The troops of the 1st Baltic and 3rd Belorussian Fronts had succeeded in pushing the Third Panzer Army back to the East Prussian border, surrounding the city of Memel and reaching the shore of the Curonian Lagoon. Stavka permitted Chernyakhovsky to further exploit this success by attacking along the Gumbinnen – Insterburg – Königsberg (now Kaliningrad) axis deep into East Prussia.

Chernyakhovsky's plan involved using the 11th Guards and 5th Armies to break open the German defensive lines, before pushing through exploitation forces from the 2nd Guards Tank Corps and 28th Army. The 31st and 39th Armies would advance on the flanks of the main force.

The opposing German forces, from the Third Panzer and Fourth Armies, were aided by the presence of substantial fortifications, and had been heavily reinforced.

Deployments

Wehrmacht
Army Group Centre (Colonel General Georg-Hans Reinhardt)
Southern flank of Third Panzer Army (Colonel General Erhard Raus)
XXXX Panzer Corps (General Sigfrid Henrici) 
IX Corps (General Rolf Wuthmann)
Northern flank of Fourth Army (General of the Infantry Friedrich Hoßbach) 
XXVII Corps (General Maximilian Felzmann)
XXXXI Panzer Corps (General Helmuth Weidling)
Fallschirm-Panzerkorps Hermann Göring (Lieutenant General Wilhelm Schmalz)
VI Corps (General Horst Großmann)

Red Army
3rd Belorussian Front (General Ivan Chernyakhovsky)
11th Guards Army (Colonel General Kuzma Galitsky)
2nd Guards Tank Corps (Major General Alexei Burdeinei)
5th Army (Lieutenant General Pyotr Shafranov for Colonel General Nikolay Krylov)
28th Army (Lieutenant General Alexander Luchinsky)
39th Army (Lieutenant General Ivan Lyudnikov)
31st Army (Colonel General Vasily Glagolev)
1st Air Army (Colonel General of Aviation Timofey Khryukin)

Offensive
On 16 October, the 5th and 11th Guards Armies went onto the offensive and initially penetrated some 11 km into the German defensive belt. The flanking armies commenced operations the next day, when units of the 11th Guards Army had already crossed the East Prussian border.

The Soviet troops ran into extremely strong resistance. It took them four days to penetrate the initial tactical defenses, and the second defense line was so strong that Chernyakhovsky was compelled to commit the 2nd Guards Tank Corps to break it. Casualties were extremely heavy.

On 20 October, the second line was ruptured by the 11th Guards Army and 2nd Guards Tank Corps east of Gumbinnen, defended by the guns of the 18th Anti-Aircraft Division and the Fallschirm-Panzerdivision Hermann Göring, which had been redeployed in the area to counter the Soviet advance. On 21 October, the Soviet reserve, the 28th Army, was committed, but the offensive in the north was fought to a standstill in the region of Ebenrode because of effective German counterattacks.

Gumbinnen was taken by 22 October but was retaken by German forces on 24 October after the Germans had committed the 5th Panzer Division, and Heavy Panzer Detachment 505 (equipped with Tiger IIs). Also, Nemmersdorf, on the banks of the Angrapa River, was taken by units of the 2nd Guards Tank Corps on 21 October but was retaken by German forces on 23 October.  

Units of 11th Guards Army found themselves cut off in the area of Großwaltersdorf and were involved in intense fighting. In the meantime, the Germans had pressed more reserves, including the 102nd Panzer and Führer Grenadier Brigades into counterattacks at Goldap, on the southern sector of the Soviet penetration. The town was retaken on 25 October.

The Soviet attacks continued until 27 October, as the flanking armies sought to close up to the 11th Guards Army.

There was more fighting in the operation's immediate aftermath: on 28 October, the 31st Army retook Gołdap in a surprise attack. The town was again taken by the 5th Panzer Division, which was redeployed from the Gumbinnen area on 3 November.

See also
East Prussian Offensive, in which the Front renewed its attack into East Prussia the following January, this time successfully.

References

Bibliography

Dieckert, K. and Großmann, H. Der Kampf um Ostpreußen, Gräfe und Unzer Verlag, München, 1960
 
Glantz, D. The Failures of Historiography: Forgotten Battles of the Soviet-German War, https://web.archive.org/web/20161216063344/http://fmso.leavenworth.army.mil/documents/failures.htm
 

Strategic operations of the Red Army in World War II
Conflicts in 1944
East Prussia
Military operations of World War II involving Germany
Battles and operations of the Soviet–German War
1944 in Germany